Harry Preston may refer to:

 Harry Preston (writer) (1923–2009), author and screenwriter
 Harry Preston (field hockey) (1931–2004), Canadian field hockey player

See also 
 Henry Preston (disambiguation)